Rafael Lopes (born 1991), is a Portuguese football forward

Rafael Lopes may also refer to:

Rafael Lopes (Brazilian footballer) (born 1986), Brazilian football right-back
Rafael Araujo-Lopes (born 1996), American gridiron football wide receiver

See also
Rafael López (disambiguation)